Paul Bush (born 1956, north London) is a British experimental film director and animator.  The son of classical composer Geoffrey Bush, Paul Bush studied Fine Art at Goldsmiths College under Michael Craig-Martin. He later taught himself how to make films while a member of the London Film-Makers' Co-op.

He has since made numerous short and medium length films including The Cows Drama (1984), His Comedy (1994), Rumour of True Things (1996), Furniture Poetry (1999), While Darwin Sleeps (2004), and many others. He has won prizes at animation festivals in the Netherlands, Barcelona, Zagreb, Hiroshima, Bombay, Chicago and other places throughout the world.  His website contains extracts of many of his films.

His films "Furniture Poetry"(1999)  and 'While Darwin Sleeps' (2004) closely resemble Jan Švankmajer's animation 'Historia Naturae, Suita' (1967)

In addition to directing and animating, Bush pioneered a technique seen in a number of his films, including The Albatross. The technique involves scratching frame by frame directly into the surface of colour filmstock over live action footage, creating an animated sequence which resembles traditional wood engraving. Since 2002 Bush has increasingly focused on time lapse portraits of people and more conventional animation including a collaboration with artist Lisa Milroy which produced Geisha Grooming (2003).

Between 1981 and 1993, Bush also taught film-making, established a film workshop in South London, and supervised a wide variety of courses and the production of numerous student films. between 1995 and 2001 he taught on the visual arts course at Goldsmiths.  Bush has lectured, run workshops and tutored at numerous art and film courses around the world including:
Media Academy of Cologne
National Film Board of Canada
The Netherlands Institute of Animation Films
CalArts
Centro Sperimentale di Cinematografia
St. Lukas in Brussels
KASK in Ghent
Anadolou University in Turkey
Hochschule Luzern - Design & Kunst
Royal College of Art
Duncan of Jordanstone College of Art and Design
National Film and Television School (NFTS)
CineToro Film Festival

Bush currently teaches at HGK Lucerne and the NFTS.  He lives in London and has two children.

External links
Paul Bush Films

Paul Bush in the Video Data Bank

British experimental filmmakers
Living people
1956 births
Alumni of Goldsmiths, University of London